Brainpool TV GmbH is a German television production company located in Cologne. It was a subsidiary of VIVA Medien AG between 2001 and 2006, until a management buyout in January 2007, now owned by Banijay. The film Stromberg – The Movie was crowdfunded with €1,000,000 in one week by 3,000 fans in December 2011.

At the beginning of 2019 it was announced that Banijay Germany CEO and shareholder Marcus Wolter had been appointed as the new managing director. In June 2020, Banijay took over the rest of the shares.

Productions 
 Die Harald Schmidt Show (until July 1998, from then Bonito)
 Die Wochenshow
 TV total
 Ladykracher
 Elton.tv
 Rent a Pocher
 RTL Promiboxen
 Der Bachelor
 Anke Late Night
 Stromberg
 Bundesvision Song Contest
 Unser Star für Oslo
 Unser Song für Deutschland
 Unser Star für Baku
 Unser Song für Malmö
 Unser Song für Dänemark
 Unser Song für Österreich
 Eurovision Song Contest 2011
 Eurovision Song Contest 2012
 Free European Song Contest

References

External links 
 Official website

Television production companies of Germany
Companies based in Cologne
Mülheim, Cologne
Mass media in Cologne
Banijay